Mark Beaumont (born 2 June 1972) is an English music journalist.

Career and writing style
A contributor to such titles as The Times, Shortlist, The Guardian and Uncut, Beaumont's writings have predominantly appeared in the NME where he has written numerous reviews and interviews since 1995 and has also functioned as the magazine's letters and singles page editor.  Considered by NME editor Conor McNicholas one of the title's "star" writers, Beaumont has frequently been assigned the task of reviewing latest releases and gigs from high-profile artists (Arctic Monkeys, Black Rebel Motorcycle Club, Coldplay) and Muse.

In his writings, Beaumont has often favoured a caustic, confrontational and at times humorous prose style, especially when writing on artists or records that he does not hold in particularly high regard.

He has also been noted for caustic left-wing political opinions, often entirely unrelated to the media being reviewed. In 2021 when reviewing Netflix's 'Chernobyl 1986' Beaumont described the United Kingdom as; 'a country that has overseen over 120,000 largely unnecessary deaths during a national crisis due to the incompetence, lies, contempt for its citizens and rampant cover-ups and cronyism of its extremist government'. In the same article he further describes the 2019 HBO Chernobyl miniseries as being; 'very handy at a time when it might be politically advantageous to conflate the nightmares of communism with the potentials of socialism'. 

Beaumont wrote a band biography for the liner notes of the band Mansun's  posthumous album, Kleptomania.

Beaumont released a biography of the band Muse entitled Out Of This World in the autumn of 2008.

In September 2012 his latest artist biography, Jay-Z: The King Of America, was released by Omnibus Press.

In June 2014, Omnibus Press published his biography of the band The Killers.

2007 Keith Richards interview
In April 2007, Beaumont found himself at the centre of a media storm when NME magazine published his now-infamous interview with Keith Richards. Beaumont had asked Richards what the strangest thing he had ever snorted was, and quoted him as replying:

Amid the media uproar that followed, Richards' manager claimed the remark had been made in jest, but Beaumont told the BBC Radio 4 Today programme that he believed Richards had been telling the truth, adding that "He did seem to be quite honest about it. There were too many details for him to be making it up". He later told Uncut magazine that the interview had been conducted by telephone and that he had misquoted Richards at one point (reporting that Richards had said he listens to Motörhead, when what he had said was Mozart), but that he still believed the veracity of the ash-snorting anecdote. Richards later confirmed in an interview with Mojo magazine that he had, in fact, snorted his father's ashes - with no cocaine mixed in - before burying them under an oak tree: "I said I'd chopped him up like cocaine, not with."

References

External links
Beaumont's "Raving Reporter" NME Blog

English music journalists
Melody Maker writers
1972 births
Living people
People from Enfield, London